The London College of Communication is a constituent college of the University of the Arts London. Its origins are in the printing and retail industries and it now provides media-related subjects including advertising, animation, film, graphic design, photography and sound arts. 

It has approximately 5000 students, and offers about sixty courses at foundation, undergraduate and postgraduate level. It is organised in three schools: media, design and screen; all are housed in a single building in Elephant and Castle. It received its present name in 2003; it was previously the London School of Printing and Graphic Arts, then the London College of Printing, and briefly the London College of Printing and Distributive Trades.

History 

The school was formed in 1990 by the merger of the College for Distributive Trades with the London College of Printing.

The London College of Printing descended from the St Bride's Foundation Institute Printing School, which was established in November 1894 under the City of London Parochial Charities Act of 1883. The Guild and Technical School opened in Clerkenwell in the same year, but moved a year later to Bolt Court, and became the Bolt Court Technical School; it was later renamed the London County Council School of Photoengraving and Lithography. 

St Bride's came under the control of the London County Council in 1922 and was renamed the London School of Printing and Kindred Trades; in 1949 it was merged with the LCC School of Photoengraving and Lithography, forming the London School of Printing and Graphic Arts. In 1960 this was renamed the London College of Printing. The printing department of the North Western Polytechnic was merged into it in 1969. The London College of Printing became part of the London Institute in 1986.

The Westminster Day Continuation School opened in 1921, and was later renamed the College for Distributive Trades, providing practical education relating to retail and later the related area of marketing. It too became part of the London Institute in 1986. In 1990 it merged with the London College of Printing to form the London College of Printing and Distributive Trades, which in 1996 was renamed the London College of Communication.

In 2003 the London Institute received Privy Council approval for university status, and in 2004 was renamed University of the Arts London.

Some of the earliest paper records relating to the creation of the St Bride Institute Printing School are held at St Bride Library in Bride Lane, off Fleet Street.

Galleries, collections and lectures

In 2007, the college became the home of the University Archives and Special Collections Centre which holds the Stanley Kubrick Archive and the Tom Eckersley collection among other film, printing and graphic design related archives and collections. Since 2005 the LCC has hosted the annual Hugh Cudlipp lecture.

Cutbacks and closures 

LCC had student protests and sit-ins in November 2009, as students expressed anger over proposed course closures and staff redundancies. About 100 students tried to occupy the office of Sandra Kemp, head of the college at that time, in protest over the lack of supervision for dissertations. Students later occupied a lecture theatre and private security guards tried to remove protesting students. This failed when a member of academic staff questioned their right to touch the students and police were summoned who prevailed upon the protesters to leave the building. Several students faced disciplinary action, including suspension.

The director of the university's course in public relations resigned over the proposed cutbacks, saying that there weren't enough staff. Much of the teaching was then supplied by sessional lecturers on short-term contracts, A member of the teaching staff said that sackings resulted in cancelled lectures and students left without dissertation supervisors.

In 2011 an inquiry by the Quality Assurance Agency into restructuring at the LCC found standards were so badly affected by course closures that some students’ marks were raised to compensate. The report followed complaints by students relating to restructuring, including claims that quality had been 'severely compromised' and that those studying were not informed of the plans before enrolment. The investigation was the first of its kind and is the QAA's revised “whistleblower” process for investigating concerns about academic standards and quality. The decision to investigate the complaints followed the closure of 16 courses and 26 full-time redundancies.

Alumni 

Among the alumni of the college are Rebekah Brooks, former chief executive of News International; Jane Root, former controller of BBC Two; the advertising executive and art collector Charles Saatchi; cartoonist and illustrator Ralph Steadman; the Bengali poet and writer Sukumar Ray; and Arthur Fraser, the former director of the South African State Security Agency.

References 

University of the Arts London
Graphic design schools
Animation schools in the United Kingdom
Educational institutions established in 1894
1894 establishments in England
Printing in England
Alumni of the London College of Communication